James Callaghan, Baron Callaghan of Cardiff (1912–2005) served as Prime Minister of the United Kingdom from 1976 to 1979.

James or Jim Callaghan may also refer to:

Other politicians
James Callaghan (New Jersey politician) (1914–1972), Newark Councilman 
Jim Callaghan (Lancashire politician) (1927–2018), MP for Heywood and Middleton

Others
Jimmy Callaghan (horse racing) (c. 1902–1979), performing name of the Australian Aboriginal horse racer 
James Callaghan, Scottish football referee in the 1968–69 Scottish Cup
Jimmy Callaghan, British trucker in Eddie Stobart: Trucks & Trailers

See also
James Callahan (disambiguation)
Callaghan (surname)